Richárd Sipőcz (born 12 March 2001) is a Hungarian judoka.

References

External links
 
 

2001 births
Living people
Hungarian male judoka
21st-century Hungarian people